Eric Freedman may refer to:
Eric Freedman (journalist), American journalist and professor at Michigan State University
 Eric M. Freedman, American legal scholar and professor at Hofstra University
Eric Friedman, American musician and songwriter
Erick Friedman (1939–2004), violinist